Cambodian films move toward the modern genre. This is a list of films produced in Cambodia in 1972. Of the 39 films listed, five films exist today, two have been remade, and 32 have not yet been remade.

Highest-grossing 
The ten highest-grossing films at the Cambodian box office in 1972 were:

See also 
1972 in Cambodia

References 
 

1972
Films
Cambodian